Iznate is a town and municipality in the province of Málaga, part of the autonomous community of Andalusia in southern Spain. It is located in the comarca of La Axarquía. The municipality is situated approximately 12 kilometers from Vélez-Málaga and 45 km from the provincial capital Málaga. The Iznate river passes through Iznate.

The name derives from the medieval Berber Iznatten tribes.

Main sights
Church of St. Gregory (late 16th century)
Spring of les Tres Deseos, dating to Moorish times
Spring of Moguera, also of Moorish origin

References 

Municipalities in the Province of Málaga